The 2013–14 season will be Pandurii Târgu Jiu's 50th season in the Romanian football league system, and their eighth consecutive season in Liga I.

They finished second in the 2012–13 Liga I. Pandurii competed in UEFA Europa League, their first European participation ever, playing in the Group Stage.

Players

First-team squad

Competitions

Liga I

League table

Results summary

UEFA Europa League

Qualifying rounds

Second qualifying round

Third qualifying round

Play-off round

Group stage
Group E

Notes and references

CS Pandurii Târgu Jiu seasons
Pandurii, Târgu Jiu, CS
Pandurii Targu Jiu, CS